Franzosenwoog is a former reservoir in Pfälzerwald, Rhineland-Palatinate, Germany. It was created around 1828 to facilitate timber rafting on the nearby Hochspeyerbach and ceased to exist around 1885.

Former buildings and structures in Germany
Reservoirs in Rhineland-Palatinate
Former reservoirs